The Hassan I Dam is an embankment dam located  northeast of Demnate on the Lakhdar River in Azilal Province, Morocco. The dam's hydroelectric power plant also generates  on average annually. At  in height, it is the tallest dam in Morocco and the tallest earth-fill dam in Africa. The dam is named after Hassan I of Morocco.

See also

 List of power stations in Morocco

References

Dams completed in 1986
Energy infrastructure completed in 1991
Dams in Morocco
Embankment dams
Hydroelectric power stations in Morocco
1986 establishments in Morocco
20th-century architecture in Morocco